Mordellistena sericans is a species of beetle in the genus Mordellistena of the family Mordellidae. It was described by Fall in 1907.

References

External links
Coleoptera. BugGuide.

Beetles described in 1907
sericans